The 2004 Arkansas Razorbacks baseball team represented the University of Arkansas in the 2004 NCAA Division I baseball season. The Razorbacks were coached by Dave Van Horn, in his 2nd season with the Razorbacks, and played their home games at Baum Stadium.

Schedule and results

Razorbacks in the 2004 MLB Draft
The following members of the Arkansas Razorbacks baseball program were drafted in the 2004 Major League Baseball Draft.

References

Arkansas
Arkansas Razorbacks baseball seasons
Arkansas Razorbacks baseball
Arkansas
College World Series seasons